Bethlehem is a town in Litchfield County, Connecticut, United States. The population was 3,385 at the 2020 census, down from 3,607 at the 2010 census. The town center is a historic district and a census-designated place (CDP).

The town's name has prompted thousands of visitors each December to mail their Christmas cards at the renowned local post office, situated at 34 East Street, in order to get a "Bethlehem" postmark. The post office also has nearly 100 Christmas-related stamps for customers to decorate their envelopes during the holiday season.

Bethlehem is one of the two towns in Litchfield County served by the area code 203/area code 475 overlay. The other is the town of Woodbury.

Education
 Since 1970, elementary education has been handled by Regional School District 14, including Bethlehem Elementary School.
 Nonnewaug High School in neighboring Woodbury is the primary regional high school. 
 The Woodhall School is a private high school located in town.

Geography
Bethlehem is in southern Litchfield County and is bordered by Morris to the north, Watertown to the east, Woodbury to the south, and Washington to the west. The two largest water bodies in the town are Long Meadow Pond and the Bronson E. Lockwood Reservoir, both in the northern part of town.

Connecticut Route 61 passes through the town center, leading north to Morris and Litchfield, and south to US 6 in Woodbury. Connecticut Route 132 takes a winding route through the town, leading south to Woodbury and east into Watertown.

On the eastern side of town is a ridge called "the Devil's Backbone", one of more than 30 Connecticut places named after the devil.

Principal community
Bethlehem Village

Demographics

At the 2010 census Bethlehem had a population of 3,607. The racial composition of the population was 97.9% white, 0.4% black or African American, 0.1% Native American, 0.5% Asian, 0.2% from some other race and 0.9% from two or more races. 1.7% of the population were Hispanic or Latino of any race.

At the 2000 census, there were 3,422 people, 1,246 households and 935 families residing in the town. The racial makeup of the town was 97.49% White, 0.26% African American, 0.06% Native American, 0.79% Asian, 0.03% Pacific Islander, 0.38% from other races and 0.99% from two or more races. Hispanic or Latino of any race were 0.64% of the population.

There were 1,246 households, of which 35.2% had children under the age of 18 living with them, 65.7% were married couples living together, 6.6% had a female householder with no husband present, and 24.9% were non-families. 19.6% of all households were made up of individuals, and 7.8% had someone living alone who was 65 years of age or older. The average household size was 2.69 and the average family size was 3.11.

25.2% of the population were under the age of 18, 4.5% from 18 to 24, 26.6% from 25 to 44, 30.8% from 45 to 64, and 12.9% who were 65 years of age or older. The median age was 42 years. For every 100 females, there were 94.3 males. For every 100 females age 18 and over, there were 93.4 males.

The median household income was $68,542 and the median family income was $78,863. Males had a median income of $51,623 compared with $37,500 for females. The per capita income was $29,672. About 0.5% of families and 2.6% of the population were below the poverty line, including none of those under age 18 and 11.2% of those age 65 or over.

Transportation
Route 61 is the main north-south road while Route 132 is the main east-west road through the town.  There is no access to public transportation.  The nearest rail station (Metro North) is Waterbury, CT.  The nearest passenger commercial airports are Tweed New Haven Airport (40 miles) and Bradley International Airport (50 miles).

Local media
Waterbury Republican-American, an independent daily newspaper
Voices, a local newspaper serving Southbury, Middlebury, Oxford, Seymour, Naugatuck, Woodbury, Bethelhem, New Preston, Washington, Washington Depot, Roxbury, Bridgewater, Monroe, Sandy Hook and Newtown
Macaroni Kid, an events calendar for families in Bridgewater, Roxbury, Bethlehem, Woodbury, Southbury, Oxford, Watertown, Oakville, Middlebury, Waterbury and western Naugatuck

Points of interest
Bellamy-Ferriday House and Garden, built in 1760 and added to the National Register of Historic Places in 1982.
The Bethlehem Green Historic District contains 63 properties and was listed on the National Register of Historic Places in 1982.
Old Bethlehem Historical Society Museum
Christ Episcopal Church (Bethlehem, Connecticut)

Abbey of Regina Laudis
The town is home to the Benedictine Abbey of Regina Laudis, founded in 1947, one of the first houses of contemplative Benedictine nuns in the United States. Robert Leather, a Protestant industrialist, donated  of land on which the convent is located. The convent now has 37 nuns.

The abbey is known for its commitment to the arts, especially the performance of Gregorian chant. The acting background of Mother Dolores Hart, O.S.B., has prompted the convent to sponsor annual summer theatre productions.

Hart has worked with fellow artists, including James and Dawn Douglas, to found the Act Association, a group that performs at The Gary-The Olivia Theater, an open-air venue which seats about 200 people. Built in 1982 with the help of actress Patricia Neal, this open-air theater seats about 200 people. Productions have included plays by Shakespeare, Sartre, opera and musical reviews. Patricia Neal and James Douglas appeared in She Stoops to Conquer in 1999.

Events
Bethlehem Fair is held the last weekend of September at the town fairgrounds.
Connecticut Garlic and Harvest Festival is held in October at the town fairgrounds.
Christmas Town Festival is held the first weekend of December on the town green.

Notable people

 Christine Baranski, actress, and her husband, the actor and playwright Matthew Cowles
 Joseph Bellamy (1719–1790), influential Congregationalist theologian in the 18th century, was pastor at the Congregational church in town for 50 years, until his death
 James Douglas, died there in 2016
 Dolores Hart, former actress who appeared with Elvis Presley, became a Roman Catholic nun at the Benedictine Abbey of Regina Laudis in town, ultimately becoming head (or "prioress") of the convent. Her formal title now is the Reverend Mother Dolores Hart
 David Leavitt (1791–1879), New York City banker, financier and art collector, born at Bethlehem to the Connecticut legislator and businessman David Leavitt Sr.
 Noella Marcellino, Benedictine nun who earned a doctorate in microbiology from the University of Connecticut and became a Roman Catholic nun at the Benedictine Abbey of Regina Laudis in town. She won a Fulbright scholarship to France to collect and examine native strains of fungi from traditional cheese caves, with an emphasis on Geotrichum candidum, and stayed an additional three years on a grant from the French government in order to analyze the samples
Dani Shapiro Author and podcaster.

References

External links

Old Bethlehem Historical Society Museum
The Joseph Bellamy House: The Great Awakening in Puritan New England, a National Park Service Teaching with Historic Places (TwHP) lesson plan

 
Towns in Litchfield County, Connecticut
Populated places established in 1787
Towns in the New York metropolitan area
Towns in Connecticut